Lukjan Kobylyzja (also Lucian Kobylicza; Ukrainian: Лук'ян Кобилиця; Romanian: Luchian Cobiliță) (1812 – 1851) was a Ukrainian Bukovinian activist, political leader and farmer. He was the leader of the popular uprisings in Bukovina from 1843 to 1844 and from 1848 to 1849, and a member of the Austrian Reichstag.

Biography
Lukjan Kobylyzja was born in 1812 to serf parents in Putyla, in what is now the Ukrainian Oblast of Chernivtsi. In 1839 he was elected by the farmers as their public representative in order to represent their interests. In reaction to the ban on the use of forests by farmers, in late 1843 the farmers of 22 villages in Bukovina refused to carry out the duties imposed on them, demanding the establishment of Ukrainian schools, free access to forests and pastures and improving their status. In March 1844 the uprising was broken up with the help of government troops and Kobylyzja was arrested and imprisoned.

During the March Revolution, the Bukovinian peasants elected him a member of the newly established Austrian Reichstag in Vienna, where he stood up for their interests. In November 1848, in response to the limited peasant reform of 1848 in Galicia, Bukovina and Transcarpathia, he led an uprising in the mountain villages of the Vyshnytsia and Storozhynets districts. During this uprising, which only ended in the summer of 1849 when troops were deployed against the rebels, forests and meadows, the ownership of which was disputed by the farmers, were confiscated by the rebels who claimed they were their propriety.

Kobylyzja was arrested in Shabje in April 1850 and died of torture-related illness in 1851 in the prison of Gura Humora in the north-east of what is now Romania.

Honors
Kobylyzja is a popular hero in Bukovina. The Ukrainian poet Yuriy Fedkovych wrote a poem entitled Lukjan Kobylyzja, in which he tells his life in the form of a ballad. Hryhorij Misjun (Григорій Михайлович Мізюн; 1903–1963) wrote a drama, Lukjan Kobylyzja, about him in 1952.

References

1812 births
1851 deaths
Politicians from Chernivtsi
Members of the Imperial Diet (Austria)
Ukrainian dissidents